Forget All Remember is a 2014 Chinese youth romance film directed by Guo Tingbo. It was released on December 24.

Cast
Fu Xinbo
Michelle Bai
Tan Weiwei
Theresa Fu
Ji Jie
Simon Chung
Li Yu

Reception
By December 25, 2014, the film had earned ¥0.23 million at the Chinese box office.

References

2010s romance films
Chinese romance films